During the 2004–05 English football season, Oldham Athletic A.F.C. competed in the Football League One finishing 19th. The club enjoyed success in the cups – reaching the 4th round of the FA Cup and the area final of the Football League Trophy.

Season summary
A poor season in the league saw the club finishing 19th, with relegation avoided after manager Brian Talbot was replaced by Ronnie Moore towards the end of the season. Talbot's side had enjoyed cup success, particularly the defeat of Man City in the FA Cup third round. The club also reached the area final of the Football League Trophy for the first time.

Results
Home team's score comes first

Legend

Football League One

FA Cup

League Cup

Football League Trophy

References

2004–05
Oldham Athletic